The 2017 season was Melaka United Soccer Association's 94th season in club history and 1st season in the Malaysia Super League after 10 years did not play in the top-tier league.

Background

Background information 
Melaka United won their first consecutive Malaysia Premier League championship in the 2016 season and promote to Malaysia Super League in the 2017 season. Melaka United were knocked out of the 2016 Malaysia FA Cup in the second round by Kuala Lumpur and knocked out of the 2016 Malaysia Cup in the group stage after failed to advance to knockout-stage.

In November 2016, the club has been rebranded to be fully privatise as Melaka United Football Club as one of the effort to be fully accountable and as a preparation to play in top-tier league, the Malaysia Super League in 2017 season. On 14 November 2016, Melaka United has announced the appointment of Eric Williams to replace Mat Zan Mat Aris as the new head coach for the club. Eric Williams has previously managed the Myanmar giant, Yangon United F.C. in 2014 season.

Kit
 Supplier: Kronos
 Main sponsors: Edra & Mamee
 Other sponsors: Restoran Melayu, Hatten Groups

Squads

First-team squad

Out on loan

Friendly matches

Competitions

Overall

Overview

Malaysia Super League

Table

Results summary

Results by matchday

Matches

Malaysia FA Cup

Malaysia Cup

Group stage

Knock-out stage

Quarter-finals

Statistics

Appearances

Top scorers
The list is sorted by shirt number when total clean sheets are equal.

* Player names in bold denotes transferred out or on loan during the season

Clean sheets
The list is sorted by shirt number when total clean sheets are equal.

Discipline
The list is sorted by shirt number when total clean sheets are equal.

* Player names in bold denotes transferred out or on loan during the season

Transfers

In

Early season

Mid-season

Out

Early season

Mid-season

References

Melaka United F.C.
Melaka United F.C. seasons
Malaysian football clubs 2017 season
Malaysian football club seasons by club